The Rite of Braga (or Bragan Rite) is a Catholic liturgical rite associated with the Archdiocese of Braga in Portugal.

History 
The Rite of Braga belonged to the Roman family of liturgical rites and took shape within the Archdiocese of Braga between the 11th and 13th centuries. The Missal of Mateus, which dates to the second quarter of the twelfth century, is the oldest known source for this Rite. It was more than 200 years old at the time of Pope Pius V's papal bulls Quod a nobis of 9 July 1568 and Quo primum of 14 July 1570. The rite was unaffected by the imposition of the Roman Rite throughout the Latin Church. This was due to the exception made for regions where another rite had been in use for at least two centuries. However, the Roman Rite was increasingly adopted within the archdiocese and non-traditional elements were admitted into celebrations of the archdiocese's rite.

In the 20th century an attempt was made by Archbishop Manuel Vieira de Matos, with the approval of Pope Pius XI, to expunge these accretions, to revise the texts and to make the rite obligatory within the archdiocese. The Rite of Braga is rarely used after the Second Vatican Council.

Rite 
A peculiarity of the Rite of Braga was the recitation of the Ave Maria at the start of Mass and of the Sub tuum praesidium at the end.

In a talk on 24 October 1998,  Joseph Cardinal Ratzinger (later Pope Benedict XVI) cited the Rite of Braga as one of the liturgical rites whose variety within the Latin Church demonstrated that unity does not require liturgical uniformity.

References 

Latin liturgical rites
Roman Catholic Ecclesiastical Province of Braga